The fifth season of the American comedy television series It's Always Sunny in Philadelphia premiered on FX on September 17, 2009. The season contains 12 episodes and concluded airing on December 10, 2009. Beginning with this season, the episode's aspect ratio was changed from 4:3 to 16:9.

Season synopsis
This season sees the gang tackling the global recession in their own selfish, clueless ways, by exploiting the mortgage crisis and taking advantage of the nouveau pauvre homeless people living outside the bar thanks to the 2008 recession to growing the bar's brand by selling merchandise. The gang also follow up on last season's musical episode by putting on a wrestling show for American troops stationed in Afghanistan and Iraq, with Frank also dresses up as a trash man for his wrestling-for-the-troops persona.

In their dating lives, The Waitress announces her upcoming wedding, which sends Dee into a panic while Mac and Dennis introduce Charlie to online dating to get his mind off the fact that his days of stalking The Waitress are over once she says, "I do." Dennis introduces the gang to his manipulative guide to scoring with women, while Dee has an online relationship with a soldier who turns out to be a wheelchair user.

This season also sees Frank becoming more self-destructive and worried over his mortality: becomes a slobbering drunk, attempts to hang himself after losing all his money, has sex with Artemis (the strange actress from Sweet Dee's acting class), and tries to sleep with the same women as Dennis...after Mac has had his shot at them. The gang then decide to take a trip to the Grand Canyon as part of an item on Frank's bucket list—but the trip ends before it can begin after several unfortunate events. The gang then gets their taste of Hollywood stardom when M. Night Shyamalan films his latest movie in Philadelphia, wreak havoc at the 2009 World Series, and reignite a rivalry started ten years ago at a popular drinking contest.

Cast

Main cast
 Charlie Day as Charlie Kelly
 Glenn Howerton as Dennis Reynolds
 Rob McElhenney as Mac
 Kaitlin Olson as Dee Reynolds
 Danny DeVito as Frank Reynolds

Recurring cast
 Mary Elizabeth Ellis as The Waitress
 David Hornsby as Rickety Cricket
 Artemis Pebdani as Artemis
 Travis Schuldt as Ben The Soldier
 Lynne Marie Stewart as Bonnie Kelly
 Sandy Martin as Mrs. Mac
 Brian Unger as The Lawyer

Guest stars
 Melanie Lynskey as Kate
 Ben Koldyke as Sean
 P.J. Byrne as Tad
 Nora Dunn as Donna
 Mary Lynn Rajskub as Gail the Snail
 Suzy Nakamura as Tabitha
 Nick Wechsler as Brad
 Nasim Pedrad as Lucy
 Patricia Belcher as Judge
 Roddy Piper as Da' Maniac
 Jill Latiano as Caylee
 Mae Laborde as Gladys
 Marshall Allman as Bezzy
 Noah Bean as Art Sloan
 Cody Kasch as Cheesefoot

Episodes

Reception
The fifth season received positive reviews. On Rotten Tomatoes, it has an approval rating of 94% with an average score of 8 out of 10 based on 17 reviews. The website's critical consensus reads, "The Gang comes to accept their rotten lot in life and It's Always Sunny settles into a morbidly pleasurable groove as a comedy of foiled dreams and dunderheaded schemes."

Home media

References

External links 

 
 

2009 American television seasons
It's Always Sunny in Philadelphia